Phragmidium rosae-pimpinellifoliae is a species of fungus in the family Phragmidiaceae. A plant pathogen, it causes a rust on the stem, leaves, petioles and fruits of burnet rose and related hybrids. The fungus is found in Europe and North America.

References

Fungal plant pathogens and diseases
Rose diseases
Fungi described in 1873
Fungi of Europe
Fungi of North America